Eupithecia okadai is a moth in the family Geometridae. It is found in Japan and Korea.

The wingspan is about 20 mm. The wings are greyish white.

The larvae feed within the cones of Symplocos chinensis.

References

Moths described in 1958
okadai
Moths of Asia